The Bolshaya Bronnaya Synagogue is a Russian synagogue, located at 6 Bolshaya Bronnaya Street in Moscow.

The synagogue was built as a private synagogue by pre-revolutionary millionaire Lazar Solomonovich Polyakov. Privately constructed and owned synagogues that served congregations were a familiar tradition in many parts of Europe; in the Russian Empire, great magnates could sometimes get permission to erect private synagogues outside of the Pale of settlement when congregations could not.

The pre-war rabbi was executed by the Soviet government in 1937 and the building was converted into a trade union meeting hall. In 1991, the building was transferred to Chabad Lubavich. In 2004, a renovation was completed. The building includes classrooms, a bookstore, a lecture hall, mikvah and kosher restaurant. Since 1991, the rabbi has been Yitzchok Kogan.

In 1999 there was a failed bomb attack on the synagogue.
On January 11, 2006, the synagogue was attacked by a neo-Nazi skinhead who stabbed nine people. According to The Forward, 20-year-old Alexander Koptsev shouted "I will kill Jews" and "Heil Hitler" before stabbing at least eight men. The rabbi jumped Kotsev, and the rabbi's 18-year-old-son, Yosef Kogan, wrestled him to the ground. Kogan held the assailant until police detained him. A documentary film was made about the two incidents.

References

Synagogues in Moscow
21st-century attacks on synagogues and Jewish communal organizations
20th-century attacks on synagogues and Jewish communal organizations
Orthodox synagogues in Russia